Arthur William Busch (born 8 March 1944 in Ipswich, Queensland) is a retired field hockey player from Australia, who won the silver medal with the men's national team at the 1968 Summer Olympics in Mexico City. Busch and his teammates defeated India in the semi-final but lost to Pakistan in the final game. Busch was also a member of the Australian national team that participated in an international field hockey tournament in Pakistan in March 1969. He was the goalkeeper in an international match in August, 1969 between Australia and New Zealand. New Zealand, which had finished seventh in the 1968 Olympics, won by a score of 2–1.

Busch attended  Ipswich Grammar School. Busch was Ipswich Hockey's Australian representative from 1967 to 1973.

References

External links
 

1944 births
Living people
Olympic field hockey players of Australia
Sportspeople from Ipswich, Queensland
Australian male field hockey players
Field hockey players at the 1968 Summer Olympics
Olympic silver medalists for Australia
Olympic medalists in field hockey